The ministry of national education (MEN) was a ministerial department of the government of Poland. The ministry's prerogatives included setting educational standards and youth activities. It did not oversee higher education, which fell under ministry of science and higher education. In January 2021 the two were merged back.

The ministry, established in 1944, succeeded the pre-war ministry of religious affairs and public education.

Headquarters
The seat of the Ministry is the building of the Ministry of Religious Denominations and Public Enlightenment in Warsaw. The building was constructed in the years 1925-1930 according to the design of Professor Zdzisław Mączeński for the then Ministry of Religious Denominations and Public Enlightenment.

List of ministers

Ministers of Education
 Stanisław Skrzeszewski  (PPR) 31 December 1944 – 28 June 1945 (PKWN)
 Czesław Wycech (ZSL) 28 June 1945 – 5 February 1947
 Stanisław Skrzeszewski (PZPR) February 1947 – 7 July 1950
 Witold Jarosiński (PZPR) 7 July 1950 – 4 August 1956
 Feliks Baranowski (PZPR) 11 September 1956 – 13 November 1956
 Władysław Bieńkowski (PZPR) 13 November 1956 – 27 October 1959
 Wacław Tułodziecki (PZPR) 27 October 1959 – 11 November 1966

Ministers of Education and Higher Education
 Henryk Jabłoński (PZPR) 11 November 1966 – 28 March 1972

Ministers of Education and Behavior
 Jerzy Kuberski (PZPR) 29 March 1972 – 8 February 1979
 Józef Tejchma (PZPR) 8 February 1979 – 2 April 1980
 Krzysztof Kruszewski (PZPR) 3 April 1980 – 12 February 1981
 Bolesław Faron (PZPR) 12 February 1981 – 6 November 1985
 Joanna Michałowska-Gumowska (PZPR) 12 November 1985 – 23 October 1987

Ministers of National Education
 Henryk Bednarski (PZPR) 23 October 1987 – 14 October 1988
 Jacek Fisiak (PZPR) 14 October 1988 – 1 August 1989
 Henryk Samsonowicz (NSZZ Solidarność) 12 September 1989 – 14 December 1990
 Robert Głębocki (KLD) 12 January 1991 – 5 December 1991
 Andrzej Stelmachowski (no party) 23 December 1991 – 5 June 1992
 Zdobysław Flisowski (no party) 11 July 1992 – 26 October 1993
 Aleksander Łuczak (PSL) 26 October 1993 – 1 March 1995
 Ryszard Czarny (SdRP) 4 March 1995 – 26 January 1996
 Jerzy Wiatr (SdRP) 15 February 1996 – 17 October 1997
 Mirosław Handke (Solidarity Electoral Action) 31 October 1997 – 20 July 2000
 Edmund Wittbrodt (Solidarity Electoral Action) 20 July 2000 – 19 October 2001

Ministers of National Education and Sport
 Krystyna Łybacka (SLD) 19 October 2001 – 2 May 2004
 Mirosław Sawicki (no party) 2 May 2004 – 1 September 2005

Ministers of National Education
 Mirosław Sawicki (no party) 1 September 2005 – 31 October 2005

Ministers of Education and Science
 Michał Seweryński (PiS) 31 October 2005 – 5 May 2006

Ministers of National Education
 Roman Giertych (LPR) 5 May 2006 – 13 August 2007
 Ryszard Legutko (no party) 13 August 2007 – 16 November 2007
 Katarzyna Hall (no party) 16 November 2007 – 18 November 2011
 Krystyna Szumilas (PO) 18 November 2011 – 27 November 2013
 Joanna Kluzik-Rostkowska (PO) 27 November 2013 - 16 November 2015
 Anna Zalewska (PiS) 16 November 2015 –  4 June 2019
 Dariusz Piontkowski (PiS) 4 June 2019 – 19 October 2020
 Przemysław Czarnek 19 October 2020 – January 1, 2021

Ministers of Education and Science
 Przemysław Czarnek (PiS) since 2020

See also
Komisja Edukacji Narodowej

References

External links
 http://www.men.gov.pl/

Poland, National Education
National Education
Poland, National Education